Pamela Susan Brull, sometimes credited as Pam Brull, is an American actress.

Theatre
Brull starred on Broadway (1990) in the original production of Rupert Holmes' Accomplice as the character 'Harley'. She also performed the role at the Pasadena Playhouse where the play made its debut (1989).  Brull was featured in the pilot of Seinfeld (1989).

Brull is a member of the Los Angeles based theatre company, INTERACT.

Filmography

References

External links

Living people
American stage actresses
American film actresses
American television actresses
People from Monterey Park, California
Actresses from California
20th-century American actresses
21st-century American actresses
Year of birth missing (living people)